Tangut may refer to:

Tangut people, an ancient ethnic group in Northwest China
Tangut language, the extinct language spoken by the Tangut people
Tangut script, the writing system used to write the Tangut language
Tangut (Unicode block)
Western Xia (1038–1227), also known as the Tangut Empire, a state founded by the Tangut people

In 18th and 19th century works, the term 'Tangut' is often used as a synonym for Tibet or Tibetan, and may refer to:
Tibet
Tibetan people
Tibetan language
Tibetan script

A number of plants found in the region of Tibet have been given the specific epithet tangutica or tanguticus:
Anisodus tanguticus
Caragana tangutica
Caryopteris tangutica
Clematis tangutica
Daphne tangutica
Lonicera tangutica
Prunus tangutica
Saussurea tangutica
Scopolia tangutica
Sinacalia tangutica

Language and nationality disambiguation pages